Barcelona was an Indie rock, pop, and new wave band from Arlington, Virginia consisting of Jason Korzen, Jennifer Carr, Ivan Ramiscal, and Christian Scanniello. The band addresses geeky themes in many of their songs, such as "The Downside of Computer Camp", "I Have the Password to Your Shell Account", and "Paging System Operator", about a boy who contacts someone in Sweden whom he believes to be an experienced cracker, using a BBS, only to find he is also a thirteen-year-old.

History

1998: Formation
Barcelona was formed in 1998 by Korzen and Carr.  The pair recruited Ramiscal and Scanniello and began writing and performing original songs that year.  Later that year, the group met producer/engineer Trevor Kampmann (also known as Trevor Holland) and began work on its first LP, Simon Basic, which included the single Why Do You Have So Much Fun Without Me?.

1999: Simon Basic
The band signed to March Records in early 1999 and released Simon Basic in June 1999. The album takes its name from the Simons' BASIC programming language, developed for the Commodore 64. In the fall of 1999, it embarked on its first tour, mainly on the East Coast, but also including Chicago.

2000: Zero One Infinity
In 2000, the band began work on Zero One Infinity, again with producer Kampmann.  The album includes I Have the Password to Your Shell Account (which received some circulation on the Internet), "Studio Hair Gel", "Robot Trouble" and "Kasey Keller", an ode to the American soccer player.  "Studio Hair Gel" and "Robot Trouble" were both released as singles prior to the album and included remixes by Figurine, Dntel and Baxendale.  The band toured again in the fall of 2000 on ZOI, and the album was well received.

2001: Transhuman Revolution
Barcelona recorded Transhuman Revolution in 2001 again with Kampmann. The album includes the singles "Everything Makes Me Think about Sex" and "Human Simulation". Shortly after the album's release, the band played its final show at The Metro Cafe in Washington, D.C. in February 2002.

Post-Barcelona
Korzen formed Sprites with his wife, Amy Korzen. Both Scanniello and Ramiscal have contributed to the project.

Ramiscal formed The Positions.

Members
 Jason Korzen
 Jennifer Carr
 Ivan Ramiscal
 Christian Scanniello

Discography

Albums
Simon Basic (1999)
Zero One Infinity (2000)
Transhuman Revolution (2001)

See also
Barcelona, Seattle band formed in 2005

External links
 Barcelona on Myspace
 

American new wave musical groups
Musical groups disestablished in 2001
Universal Motown Records artists